Venustiano Carranza was a Mexican revolutionary.
Things named for Carranza:
Venustiano Carranza, Baja California 
Venustiano Carranza, Chiapas
Venustiano Carranza, Mexico City, a borough of Mexico City
Venustiano Carranza, Michoacán
Estadio Venustiano Carranza in Morelia, Mexico
Venustiano Carranza International Airport in Monclova, Coahuila, Mexico
Venustiano Carranza Street, a major street in the Historic Center of Mexico City
Venustiano Carranza (Mexibús), a BRT station in Ecatepec de Morelos, Mexico
Venustiano Carranza (Mexico City Metrobús), a BRT station in Venustiano Carranza, Mexico City

See also
Carranza (disambiguation)